Nissl may refer to:

 Nissl body, also known as Nissl substance or Nissl material, a component of neurons
 Franz Nissl, the German medical researcher who discovered them